Lyn Terangi Adam (born August 8, 1947) is a Nauruan politician.

Political role
Living at the Buada Lagoon, Adam was elected to the Parliament of Nauru for the Buada Constituency in the 2000 general elections. This was somewhat of a noted achievement, given that Adam thereby ousted former President of Nauru Ruben Kun from his Parliamentary seat. He was acting Speaker of the Parliament of Nauru in July 2004.

Loss of Parliamentary seat
In 2007 he lost his seat to Shadlog Bernicke.
He again sought election in April 2010 but failed to get elected.

See also
 Politics of Nauru
 Elections in Nauru

References

1947 births
Living people
Members of the Parliament of Nauru
People from Buada District
Speakers of the Parliament of Nauru
21st-century Nauruan politicians